Gemignani is an Italian surname, which can be equally written as Geminiani, Gimignani or Giminiani; it belongs to an Italian noble family, whose origins are dated back to medieval Tuscany, and especially in the town of Lucca. Probably the name derived from the name of Saint Geminianus or the town of San Gimignano.

The family coat of arms figures a red Fleur-de-lis, above three mountains, on a silver background.

Notable family members 
 Francesco Geminiani, composer and musician, born in Lucca, in 1680;
 Giacinto Gimignani, painter, born in Pistoia in 1611;
 Lodovico Gimignani, son of Giacinto, and painter as well as his father;
 Alberto Gemignani, who served the Queen of Hungary in the 18th century;
 Valmore Gemignani, sculptor, born in Carrara in 1878 and working in Florence;
 Raphaël Géminiani, cyclist and good friend of Fausto Coppi, born in Clermont-Ferrand (France) in 1925;
 Paul Gemignani, American musical director

References

Italian families
Roman Catholic families